The Guercha is a short mountain river that flows through the Alpes-Maritimes department of southeastern France. Its source is in the Maritime Alps, close to the Italian border. It flows into the Tinée in Isola.

References

Rivers of France
Rivers of Alpes-Maritimes
Rivers of Provence-Alpes-Côte d'Azur